Utman Khel Subdivision is a subdivision located in Bajaur District, Khyber Pakhtunkhwa, Pakistan. The population is 107,356 according to the 2017 census.

Utman Khel Subdivision borders Munda Tehsil, Lower Dir District.

Utman Khel Subdivision is considered to be the safest subdivision in Bajaur District.

See also 
 List of tehsils of the Federally Administered Tribal Areas

References 

Tehsils of Khyber Pakhtunkhwa
Populated places in Bajaur District